Jungle Cavalcade is a compilation of footage from Frank Buck’s first three films depicting his adventures capturing animals for the world's zoos.

Scenes
Among the scenes in the film:
 In the Sumatran jungle, Buck builds a trap baited with a durian fruit to capture a giant orangutan for a St. Louis zoo.
 When he sees a baby elephant pursued by a tiger, Buck shoots the tiger and captures the elephant.
Buck captures a rare spotted leopard by shooting off the tree limb supporting the cat
After building a four-acre corral, Buck stampedes a herd of elephants into it and then singles out individual elephants to send to zoos.

Release 

References

External links

1941 films
American black-and-white films
RKO Pictures films
1941 adventure films
Compilation films
Films scored by Nathaniel Shilkret
American adventure films
1940s English-language films
1940s American films